The Huntsville Championship is a golf tournament on the Korn Ferry Tour. It was first played from April 29 to May 2, 2021, at The Ledges in Huntsville, Alabama; it had been scheduled to be played in 2020, but was canceled due to the COVID-19 pandemic.

Winners

Bolded golfers graduated to the PGA Tour via the Korn Ferry Tour regular-season money list.

References

External links
Coverage on the Korn Ferry Tour's official site

Korn Ferry Tour events
Golf in Alabama
Recurring sporting events established in 2021